Rainer Trost (born 1966) is a German tenor whose performance repertoire encompasses operas, operettas, Lieder and oratorios. He is known for roles in Mozart operas. He is also a voice teacher at the University of Music and Performing Arts Vienna.

Life 
Trost spent his childhood and youth in Stuttgart where he was born. In his hometown, he was a member of the Stuttgarter Hymnus-Chorknaben for many years. He first studied law, but turned to singing, studying in Freiburg im Breisgau, Stuttgart and from 1987 to 1991 at tclarifyhe Hochschule für Musik in Munich, among others with Adalbert Kraus. Subsequently, the singer was an ensemble member of the Staatsoper Hannover until 1995.

In 1992, Trost launched his international career as Ferrando in Mozart's Così fan tutte with conductor John Eliot Gardiner in Paris This performance was recorded live and released on the Deutsche Grammophon label. A Guardian review wrote:"few tenors on disc can rival the German Rainer Trost in the heady beauty of his voice — above all in Ferrando's aria Una Aura Amorosa". Later Trost performed especially with the tenor roles in Mozart operas such as Tamino, Belmonte, Ferrando, Don Ottavio, Idamante and the title role in La clemenza di Tito. He has appeared in Hamburg, Lisbon, Amsterdam, Ludwigsburg, Paris, Vienna, Geneva, Berlin, Brussels, Cologne, Barcelona, the Metropolitan Opera, at the Salzburg Festival and the Edinburgh Festival, at the Maggio Musicale in Florence and at the Royal Opera House Covent Garden in London. He also appeared as Count Balduin Zedlau in Wiener Blut by Johann Strauss at the Seefestspiele Mörbisch in August 2007, and as Arbace in Dieter Dorn's new production of Idomeneo on 14 June 2008 for the reopening of the Cuvilliés-Theater in Munich. He enjoyed success as Pylade in Gluck's Iphigénie en Tauride at the Theater an der Wien in October 2014. He created the role of Calogero in Manfred Trojahn's La grande magia at the Semperoper in Dresden in 2008.

Trost is also active as a concert singer. His repertoire includes works by Britten, Monteverdi, Mozart, Schubert and Bach.

Trost was appointed professor for voice at the University of Music and Performing Arts Vienna. Since 1 March 2021, he has been the deputy director of the Institute for Singing and Music Theater at the University of Music and Performing Arts Vienna.

Awards 
 2013:  – "Goldener Schikaneder" in the category best male supporting role for his role in Gluck's Telemaco at the Theater an der Wien

Recordings 
Trost recorded several operas, but also lieder, including a 2007 collection of Schubert songs with pianist Ulrich Eisenlohr. A reviewer noted that he was a "rather powerful singer but also an elegant and sensitive one. His voice has bite and character".

DVDs 
 Richard Strauss: Capriccio (with Renée Fleming and Anne Sofie von Otter) 
 Lehár: Der Graf von Luxemburg (with Juliane Banse) 
 Mozart: Così fan tutte (with Amanda Roocroft, Rod Gilfry, conducted by John Eliot Gardiner)

CDs 
 Bach: Bach-Kantaten in Berlin – 1000. Veranstaltung (BWV 11, live recording May 1998)
 Mozart: La clemenza di Tito. Deutsche Grammophon 
 Mozart: Così fan tutte. Archiv 
 Schubert: Die schöne Müllerin. Nightingale 
 Gluck: La clemenza di Tito. Deutsche Harmonia Mundi

References

External links 
 Rainer Trost (Tenor) Bach Cantatas Website
 
 Rainer Trost Operabase
 
 https://www.rainertrost.eu/

German operatic tenors
1966 births
Living people
Musicians from Stuttgart